Andy Quan (born 7 July 1969) is a Canadian author who now lives in Sydney. In his writing, he frequently explores the ways in which sexual identity and cultural identity interact. Quan is openlygay.

Quan was born in Vancouver, British Columbia, Canada. In addition to his writing, Quan is a musician and community activist. He was the first ever full-time paid employee of ILGA and has worked as a policy writer and project manager on issues related to the global HIV epidemic. He now works as an editor and copywriter.

Works 
  (with Jim Wong-Chu)
  (short fiction collection)
  (poetry)
  (erotica)
  (poetry)
  (journal)

References

External links
Andy Quan website

1969 births
Living people
Canadian expatriates in Australia
Canadian people of Chinese descent
Canadian male short story writers
Canadian writers of Asian descent
Canadian gay writers
Writers from Vancouver
21st-century Canadian poets
Canadian LGBT poets
Canadian male poets
21st-century Canadian short story writers
21st-century Canadian male writers
21st-century Canadian LGBT people
Australian LGBT poets
Gay poets